HDMS Niels Juel (F363) is an  in the Royal Danish Navy. The ship is named after Niels Juel, a 17th-century Danish admiral.

Design

The class is built on the experience gained from the s, and by reusing the basic hull design of the Absalon class the Royal Danish Navy have been able to construct the Iver Huitfeldt class considerably cheaper than comparable ships.

The frigates are compatible with the Royal Danish Navy's StanFlex modular mission payload system used in the Absalons, and are designed with slots for six modules. Each of the four StanFlex positions on the missile deck is able to accommodate either the Mark 141 8-cell Harpoon launcher module, or the 12-cell Mark 56 ESSM vertical launch system. Peter Willemoes passed the British Flag Officer Sea Training test in 2015.

While the Absalon-class ships are primarily designed for command and support roles, with a large ro-ro deck, the three Iver Huitfeldt-class frigates will be equipped for an air defence role with SM-2 IIIA surface-to-air missiles, and the potential to use Tomahawk cruise missiles, a first for the Danish Navy.

The ships were constructed in blocks in Estonia and Lithuania. These blocks were then towed to the Odense Steel Shipyard where they were assembled.

Construction and career
The frigate was laid down on 22 December 2009 and launched on 21 December 2010 by Odense Steel Shipyard, at Odense. The vessel was commissioned on 7 November 2011.

From 7 May to 13 May 2022, Niels Juel took part in Exercise Mjolner 2022 held in the Arctic region. The vessel conducted its first launches of the SM-2 missiles.

Gallery

See also

References

Iver Huitfeldt-class frigates
Ships built in Odense
2010 ships